Rocco Francis Segretta (April 24, 1899 – July 9, 1953) was an American football end who played one game for the Hartford Blues in 1926. He wore number 19. He also played for another team, the Bristol West Ends.

References

1899 births
1953 deaths
Hartford Blues players
People from Monreale
Italian players of American football
American football ends
Sportspeople from the Province of Palermo
Italian emigrants to the United States